Stephen Bryce Scott (born 2 February 1967) is a former Zimbabwean cricketer. Born in Salisbury (now Harare), he played one first-class match for Mashonaland Country Districts during the 1993–94 Logan Cup.

References

External links
 
 

1967 births
Living people
Cricketers from Harare
Mashonaland cricketers
Zimbabwean cricketers